General elections were held in the Kingdom of Romania between 9 and 15 March 1901.

References

Romania
Parliamentary elections in Romania
1901 in Romania
1901 elections in Romania
March 1901 events